"What a Man Gotta Do" is a song by American pop rock group Jonas Brothers. It was released on January 17, 2020, through Republic Records.

Background
The group announced the song's name and release date on January 13, 2020, through social media. They promoted the song the next day through a scratch card on Spotify.

The piece is set in the key of E major in a moderate 4/4 beat. The vocal range of the brothers span two whole octaves from E3 to E5.

Critical reception
Peggy Sirota for Billboard described the song as a "catchy, toe-tapping" song accompanied by an "equally heart-melting music video".

Music video
After several days of teasing, the group released the song alongside a video in which they recreate three well-known eighties films. In the rollout to the visual's Friday, January 17, 2020 release, hints about the video's themes were revealed via retro movie posters mirroring classic late seventies and eighties films. The music video was directed by Joseph Kahn.

Synopsis
The clip stars Nick Jonas and Priyanka Chopra Jonas recreating the dancing-half-naked-in-the-living-room scene from Risky Business, Joe Jonas and Sophie Turner playing Danny and Sandy and then Cha-Cha at the school dance from Grease, and Kevin Jonas holding a boombox outside his wife Danielle's bedroom window in homage to the scene from Say Anything.... The video features also a cameo from Full Metal Jacket actor Matthew Modine.

Vegas Ride
An alternate video was released on January 21, 2020, in which the brothers ride around Las Vegas looking at the attractions.

Live performances
On January 25, 2020, the group performed the song live for the first time at the Hollywood Palladium during the Citi Sound Vault. They also performed the song live during the 62nd Annual Grammy Awards as well as a previous unreleased track called, "Five More Minutes". They performed the song live during the first show of their European leg of the Happiness Begins Tour. On February 7, 2020, they performed the song on BBC's The One Show. On February 12, 2020, just like their March 2019 number-one song, "Sucker", they performed the song live on The Late Late Show with James Corden. The Jonas Brothers performed the song along "X" (without Karol G) and "Sucker" as Exclusive 'home' sessions recorded especially for Radio 1's Big Weekend.

Charts

Weekly charts

Year-end charts

Certifications

Release history

See also
List of number-one digital songs of 2020 (U.S.)

References

2020 songs
2020 singles
Jonas Brothers songs
Music videos directed by Joseph Kahn
Republic Records singles
Songs written by Ryan Tedder
Songs written by Joe Jonas
Songs written by Nick Jonas
Songs written by Kevin Jonas